José Luis Clerc was the defending champion, but lost to José Higueras in the semifinals.
Fifth seed Higueras defeated Jimmy Arias in the final to claim the title and first prize money of $32,000.

Seeds
A champion seed is indicated in bold text while text in italics indicates the round in which that seed was eliminated.

  Guillermo Vilas (second round)
  José Luis Clerc (semifinals)
  Mats Wilander (third round)
  Peter McNamara (second round)
  José Higueras (champion)
  Andrés Gómez (quarterfinals)
  Mel Purcell (quarterfinals)
  Balázs Taróczy (second round)
  John Alexander (first round)
  Jimmy Arias (final)
  Van Winitsky (first round)
  Pablo Arraya (quarterfinals)
  Kim Warwick (first round)
  Hans Gildemeister (quarterfinals)
  Ramesh Krishnan (second round)
  Fernando Luna (first round)

Draw

Finals

Top half

Section 1

Section 2

Bottom half

Section 3

Section 4

References

External links

U.S. Clay Court Championships
1982 U.S. Clay Court Championships